Samgaksan-dong is a dong, neighbourhood of Gangbuk-gu in Seoul, South Korea. From June 30 of 2008, Former Mia-6 and 7 dongs are combined for this dong.

See also 
Administrative divisions of South Korea

References

External links
Gangbuk-gu official website
Gangbuk-gu map at the Gangbuk-gu official website
 Samgaksan-dong resident office website

Neighbourhoods of Gangbuk District